Akari Midorikawa (born 15 August 2005 in Chiba) is a Japanese professional squash player. As of February 2022, she was ranked No. 284 in the world.

References

2005 births
Living people
Japanese female squash players